FC Arsenal-2 Tula is a Russian football team from Tula, founded in 2012. Beginning in the 2014–15 season, it started playing in the Russian Professional Football League (third level). It is a farm club for FC Arsenal Tula. It was dissolved after the 2016–17 season. From 1998 to 2002 a different club was called FC Arsenal-2 Tula, that club last competed under the name FC Dynamo Tula. From 2017–18 to 2020–21 season, Arsenal's farm club played professionally as FC Khimik-Arsenal. For the 2021–22 season, it was registered as FC Arsenal-2 Tula once again.

Current squad
As of 22 February 2023, according to the Second League website.

References

External links
  Official website

Association football clubs established in 2012
Football clubs in Russia
Sport in Tula, Russia
2012 establishments in Russia